PatoBike–BMC is a women's professional road bicycle racing team which participates in elite women's races.

Team roster

Major results
2018
Copa Federacion de Ruta Aguascalientes, Lizbeth Yareli Salazar
Stage 3 Tucson Bicycle Classic, Paola Muñoz
Overall La Vuelta Yucatán–MZ Tour, Brenda Andrea Santoyo
Prologue, Lizbeth Yareli Salazar
Stages 1, 2 & 3 (ITT), Brenda Andrea Santoyo
Stage 4, Paola Muñoz
Overall Vuelta Femenina a Guatemala, Brenda Andrea Santoyo
Stage 1, Brenda Andrea Santoyo
Stage 2, Marcela Prieto
Stage 4, Paola Muñoz
Points classification Vuelta a Colombia Femenina, Marcela Prieto
Youth classification, Marcela Prieto
Stage 1, Brenda Andrea Santoyo
Stage 4, Marcela Prieto
Gran Premio ICODER, Maria José Vargas
Gran Premio Comite Olimpico Nacional Femenino, Marcela Elizabeth Prieto
 Points classification Vuelta Internacional Femenina a Costa Rica, Maria José Vargas
 Youth classification, Maria José Vargas
 Mountains classification, Brenda Andrea Santoyo
Stage 1, Brenda Andrea Santoyo
Stage 3, Maria José Vargas

2019
Stage 3 Joe Martin Stage Race, Andrea Ramírez
Central American Championship, Road Race, Maria José Vargas Barrientos
Youth classification Vuelta Femenina a Guatemala, Andrea Ramírez
Clásica CRC 506, Andrea Ramírez
Clásica Esencial Costa Rica, Andrea Ramírez
Overall Vuelta Tica Internacional, Marcela Prieto
Stages 1 & 2 (ITT), Marcela Prieto
Stage 3, Brenda Andrea Santoyo
2020
Team classification Women's Herald Sun Tour

National Championships
2018
 Costa Rica Time Trial, Maria José Vargas
 Costa Rica Road Race, Maria José Vargas
 Mexico Road Race, Brenda Andrea Santoyo

2019
Pan American Championships Road Race, Ariadna Gutiérrez
 Mexico Time Trial, Andrea Ramírez
 Costa Rica Time Trial, Maria José Vargas
 Mexico Road Race, category Under 23, Anet Barrera
 Mexico Road Race, category Elite, Ariadna Gutiérrez

References

External links

UCI Women's Teams
Cycling teams based in Mexico
Cycling teams established in 2018